Cars of the People is a series of spin-off factual programmes of the BBC Two factual television series Top Gear, presented by James May, which look at how the motor vehicle became an everyday part of human life.

Broadcast
Although billed as a stand-alone series in the United Kingdom, international broadcasts are billed as special episodes of Top Gear, designed to bridge the gap between the broadcast of each series. Each episode is filmed in the same style as Top Gear, with many of the same cast and crew, as well as featuring jokes which relate to events or sequences in the parent series.

The first series of three episodes began on 10 August 2014, bridging the gap between Series 21 and 22 of Top Gear. A second series of three episodes was set to be broadcast in 2015; but was indefinitely delayed due to the scandal which saw presenter Jeremy Clarkson dropped from the parent series, which in turn led to the departures of both Richard Hammond and May. The second series was eventually broadcast in January 2016. May has confirmed that no further episodes will be produced due to his commitment to Amazon Prime Video.

Episodes

Series overview

Series 1 (2014)

Series 2 (2016)

Home media
The first series was released on DVD in Australia on 5 August 2015.

References

External links 
 
 

Cars Of The People
2014 British television series debuts
2016 British television series endings
BBC television documentaries
English-language television shows